is a fictional character in Capcom's Street Fighter fighting game series. Originally an unplayable boss in the first installment, he became a playable character in later games. Sagat is depicted as a renowned Muay Thai expert known for his incredible power and height. His signature move is the "Tiger Knee". He is often called the "Emperor of Muay Thai" in his home country. He was possibly named after Sagat Petchyindee.

Appearances

In video games
Sagat first appears as the main antagonist and final boss of the original Street Fighter. After the player defeats the eight initial opponents, their character Ryu (or Ken on Player 2's side) is taken to Thailand to face the final two opponents: Adon, Sagat's apprentice and Sagat himself. After being defeated, Sagat tells the player that he or she is the "strongest Street Fighter in the world".

His next appearance was in Street Fighter II: The World Warrior, where he appears as one of the four Grand Masters, being the third CPU-controlled boss in the single player mode before M. Bison. He appears in this game with multiple scars, including a large diagonal one across his chest that he received from Ryu as a result of his loss in the first game. This scar reminds Sagat of the grudge he harbors against Ryu after the loss in the first tournament. Like the other bosses, he became a playable character in the subsequent revisions of the game beginning with Street Fighter II': Champion Edition.

Sagat appears in the prequel series Street Fighter Alpha. In addition to fleshing out his rivalry with Ryu, a rivalry with his former apprentice Adon is introduced there as well, along with Dan Hibiki, a character whose father, Go, was killed by Sagat in a fight years before. It was also revealed that Sagat lost his right eye while fighting Dan's father. The Alpha series also show him to become part of M. Bison's criminal organization Shadaloo, but leaves in Street Fighter Alpha 3 after he discovers that Bison had wanted to experiment his Psycho Power against Ryu, allowing him to realize the pettiness of his vendetta against Ryu. Sagat is an unlockable character in Street Fighter EX3, where his story has his resentment for Ryu fading. 

Sagat returns in Street Fighter IV once again as a playable character with the animosity in his feud with Ryu no longer present and even referring to him in his ending as a "friend". In Street Fighter V, Sagat is featured as part of the third season of downloadable content. During his story, he is briefly tempted by Satsui no Hadō but overcomes it, coming to understand Ryu's struggles in the process.

Sagat also appears in crossover games such as Capcom vs. SNK 2 and Street Fighter X Tekken, in which he is paired up with Dhalsim and in other titles, including mobile puzzle game Street Fighter: Puzzle Spirits, where he is a super-deformed character.

Character design
His hands are massive enough to close around the entire head of many of his opponents. He is depicted as being bald.

In the Street Fighter II series, Sagat's in-game sprite does not display the highly muscular build of the Street Fighter Alpha series, although even at that time he had been consistently portrayed so in his Super Street Fighter II Turbo ending, and other Capcom artworks. Later on, the game graphics developed to match those of the comics. Sagat wears an eyepatch over his severely damaged right eye, though the lack of depth perception and loss of peripheral vision do not seriously hamper his ability as a powerful fighter. Sagat lost his eye during a fight with Dan Hibiki's father, Go, in which Sagat killed him. The massive scar on his chest is a constant reminder of Ryu's victory. Sagat makes no attempt to conceal the disfigurement, and in fact draws power from the hateful memory it invokes; in Capcom vs. SNK 2, Sagat's scar glows while he charges energy for his S-Groove super meter.

Sagat wears traditional Muay Thai shorts (which have the word "Tiger" printed on the waistband) and classic wraps. The trunks have colors varying from purple with white trim in the original Street Fighter, to blue with red trim in Street Fighter II and to blue with yellow trim in Street Fighter Alpha. He wears tape around his hands and feet to protect his knuckles and shins.

The scar on his chest is similar to the one Kazuya Mishima has in the Tekken series.

In Street Fighter V he is given a pet tiger named Willa Maiu (แมว).

In other media
In the anime film Street Fighter II: The Animated Movie, Sagat appears in the opening scene fighting against Ryu during a thunderstorm, receiving his iconic chest wound at the climax of the fight. The battle takes place at a grass field during a stormy night, a scenery which was remade as a stage in Street Fighter Alpha 2 for Sagat's final match in the single-player mode against Ryu. Afterwards, he is seen working for Bison. Though he has little impact on the film's main story, he asks Bison for a chance to fight Ryu again when they locate him, but Bison refuses and instead sends Sagat to New York to dispatch Cammy and Vega. His fate after this is unknown. He was voiced by Shigezo Sasaoka in Japanese and Peter Spellos (as David Conrad) in English.

In the live-action film version of Street Fighter, Sagat was portrayed by Native American actor Wes Studi as one of the film's main antagonists. He was given the full name of Viktor Sagat and is depicted in the film as a black market arms dealer that runs the Shadaloo Tong and gets conned by Ryu and Ken. He is also depicted with his eye patch over his left eye, instead of his right. In this version, he was a former Muay Thai cagefighter who went by the name "Iron Fist" before retiring. In the film's climax, he is defeated by Ken, but escapes from Bison's base before it explodes and apparently evades capture. In the video game versions of Street Fighter: The Movie for the arcade and home consoles, the film version of Sagat is a selectable character, where he wears yellow boxing trunks and lacks his chest scar.

In the American animated TV series Street Fighter, which combined plot elements of the game and the live-action movie mentioned above, he is depicted as Bison's second in command. Once again, he is given the full name of Viktor Sagat.

In the Japanese Street Fighter II V animated series, Sagat is a former Muay Thai champion who was falsely incriminated by a drug ring known as the Ashura (a division of Shadaloo) after refusing to throw a fight for them. He encounters Ryu after he is imprisoned in the same jail as a result of a frame-up by the same gang. They start off as rivals, but eventually develop a mutual respect for each other and team up against the prison's corrupt warden, Nucci. Ryu and Ken eventually take down Ashura and uncover evidence to clear Sagat's name, resulting in Sagat's release. In gratitude, Sagat directs Ryu and Ken to seek out Dhalsim in India to learn Hadou. Dhalsim himself mentions that Sagat once visited him, seeking to learn Hadou, but Dhalsim refused. The Sagat in this series lacks the eye-patch and scar from his video game counterpart. He also has a darker skin tone and wears a Mongkhon on his head. This version is not antagonistic and is not affiliated with Shadaloo as opposed to other versions. In the English dub, he makes a reference to his sisters, confirming that he is not an only child.

1990s rapper Sagat derived his stage name from the character. He even wore an eye patch over one eye, similar to the character.

In "Imaginationland", an Emmy-winning South Park episode, a representation of the character is included in a shot alongside other noted imaginary villains, including fellow Street Fighter antagonist Akuma.

Reception
Sagat ranked at number 22 in the list of Best Characters of 1991 from the February 1992 issue of Gamest magazine in Japan. IGN ranked Sagat at number eleven in their "Top 25 Street Fighter Characters" article, noting him as one of the few characters in the original Street Fighter and adding "The shaved head, the scarred chest, and most of all the eyepatch, they come together to make a guy who means business." GameDaily listed him at number eight on their "Top 20 Street Fighter Characters of All Time" article, citing his role as the first boss in the series and praising his appearance. UGO Networks placed him at the first spot on their list of "Top 50 Street Fighter Characters", stating "Sagat is arguably the strongest fighter in the series and an important part of the overarching storyline of the series." UGO also listed him eleventh in their article of best scarred character as the scar symbolizes Sagat's defeat at the hands of Ryu and his desire to continue fighting. GameSpy named him one of the "25 Extremely Rough Brawlers" in video gaming with comments focused on his appearance. In a humor article by GameSpy, Sagat was labelled as an overpowered character in his Street Fighter II incarnation. Similarly, his Street Fighter IV received similar complaints to the point of being compared with the game boss, Seth. In response to this, Ryota Niitsuma, assistant producer of the arcade version of the game, admitted that the two ended up being overpowered, but players could still defeat them without too many difficulties. Complex ranked Sagat as the "30th most dominant fighting game character", stating "This insanely tall Muay Thai champion is revered and respected. He doesn't have eye pupils plus he sports a nasty scar on his chest." Complex also ranked Sagat as the "6th best Street Fighter character", commenting "Sagat and Ryu have some history, but Sagat can hold his own in a fight, and if he had him in our hands on that fateful battle, he would have wrecked Ryu, plain and simple." In 2016, Screen Rant named Sagat the "9th Most Powerful Street Fighter Character", commenting "His battle prowess to warrant being a final boss again has likely long been surpassed, but he’s still a worthy rival even for somebody of the caliber of Ryu." In a 2018 worldwide poll by Capcom, Sagat was voted seventh most popular Street Fighter character.

References

Action film characters
Capcom antagonists
Fictional characters missing an eye
Fictional characters with gigantism
Fictional henchmen in video games
Fictional martial artists in video games
Fictional martial arts trainers
Fictional Muay Thai practitioners
Fictional Thai people
Male characters in video games
Male film villains
Male video game villains
Street Fighter characters
Video game bosses
Video game characters introduced in 1987
Video game characters with fire or heat abilities